The Kůlna Cave is a cave in the South Moravian Region of the Czech Republic. It is part of the Moravian Karst. Visit of Kůlna Cave is part of sightseeing tours of the Sloup-Šošůvka Caves.

Geography
It lies in the northern part of the Moravian Karst Protected Landscape Area, within the Sloup-Šošůvka Caves Nature Reserve.

Paleontology
The cave is noted for its Paleolithic and Mesolithic material and evidence of human presence. The oldest remains comprise stone tools with an estimated age of 120,000 years. Dated to about 50,000 years ago are Neanderthal skeletal remains including the upper jaw bone of an immature male (14 or 15 years old) which was discovered in 1965 and the right parietal bone of a man which was discovered in 1970.

Later objects and artifacts indicate the presence of mammoth hunters of the Gravettian culture from around 25,000 years ago, as well as reindeer and wild horse hunters from between 13,000 and 10,000 years ago. Bronze Age artifacts have also been found dating back to the 9th and 8th centuries BCE.

References

External links

Sloupsko–Šošůvka Caves official website

Archaeological sites in the Czech Republic
Caves of the Czech Republic
Show caves in the Czech Republic
Prehistoric sites in the Czech Republic
Neanderthal sites
Blansko District